An election to the Carmarthenshire County Council was held in March 1922. It was preceded by the 1919 election and followed by the 1925 election.

Overview of the result

The election saw a reduction in the number of candidates openly supporting the Liberal Party as an increasing number stood as Independents. Labour continued to gain some ground in the Llanelli and Ammanford districts.

Boundary changes

There were no boundary changes.

Unopposed returns

22 of the 53 divisions were uncontested, with the majority of the unopposed returns being in the rural parts of the county.

Contested elections

Contests in Llanelli town and in the surrounding areas saw a significant campaign by the Labour Party, but its success remained limited.

Retiring aldermen

The aldermen who retired at the election were

Summary of results

This section summarises the detailed results which are noted in the following sections. As noted, there was ambiguity in some cases over the party affiliation.

This table summarises the result of the elections in all wards. 53 councillors were elected.

|}

|}

|}

Ward results

Abergwili

Ammanford

Bettws

Caio

Carmarthen Eastern Ward (Lower Division)

Carmarthen Eastern Ward (Upper Division)

Carmarthen Western Ward (Lower Division)

Carmarthen Western Ward (Upper Division)

Cenarth

Cilycwm

Conwil

Kidwelly

Laugharne

Llanarthney

Llanboidy

Llandebie

Llandilo Rural

Llandilo Urban

Llandovery

Llandyssilio

Llanedy

Llanegwad

Llanelly Division.1

Llanelly Division 2

Llanelly Division 3

Llanelly Division 4

Llanelly Division 5

Llanelly Division 7

Llanelly Division 7

Llanelly Division 8

Llanelly Rural, Berwick

Llanelly Rural, Hengoed

Llanelly Rural, Westfa and Glyn

Llanfihangel Aberbythick

Llanfihangel-ar-Arth

Llangadock

Llangeler

Llangendeirne

Llangennech

Llangunnor

Llanon

Llansawel

Llanstephan

Llanybyther

Mothvey

Pembrey North

Pembrey South

Quarter Bach

Rhydcymmerai

St Clears

St Ishmael

Trelech

Whitland

Election of aldermen

In addition to the 53 councillors the council consisted of 17 county aldermen. Aldermen were elected by the council, and served a six-year term. Following the elections the following nine aldermen were elected (with the number of votes in each case).

References

1922
1922 Welsh local elections